This article includes the 2015 ITF Men's Circuit tournaments which occurred between October and December 2015.

Point Distribution

Key

Month

October

November

December

References

External links
 International Tennis Federation official website

2015 ITF Men's Circuit